This article consists of a non exhaustive list of educational institutions in Erode district,   Tamil Nadu, India.

Medical

Government colleges
 Government Erode Medical College

Engineering and technology

Government colleges
Government College of Engineering, Erode

Private or self-financing colleges
Bannari Amman Institute of Technology, Sathyamangalam
 Erode Sengunthar Engineering College, Perundurai
 J.K.K. Munirajah college of Technology, Gobichettipalayam
 Kongu Engineering College, Perundurai
 Nandha Engineering College, Perundurai
 Sasurie College of Engineering, Vijayamangalam
 Shree Venkateshwara Hi-Tech Engineering College, Gobichettipalayam

Arts and science
 Chikkaiah Naicker College
 Erode Arts and Science College (by The Mudaliar Educational trust), Erode
 Kongu Arts and Science College, Erode
 Gobi Arts and Science College, Gobichettipalayam
 P.K.R. Arts College for Women, Gobichettipalayam

Schools

Private
 Christhu Jyothi Matric Higher Secondary School, Erode
 Navarasam Matriculation Higher Secondary School, Erode
 Shree Vidyalaya, Gobichettipalayam
 Velalar Vidyalayaa Senior Higher Secondary School, Thindal, Erode
 Bharathi Vidya Bhavan, Erode

Government Aided
 Diamond Jubilee Higher Secondary School, Gobichettipalayam
 Sengunthar Higher Secondary School, Erode

See also
 List of educational institutions in Gobichettipalayam

References

Education in Erode
Erode